Alexander Zozulya (born 8 October 1993 in Astana) is a Kazakhstani professional ice hockey player currently playing for Arystan Temirtau in the Kazakhstan Hockey Championship league.

References

External links

Kazakhstani ice hockey forwards
Arystan Temirtau players
Sportspeople from Astana
1993 births
Living people